Pattonsburg is an unincorporated community in Marshall County, Illinois, United States, located  east-northeast of Washburn.

References

Unincorporated communities in Marshall County, Illinois
Unincorporated communities in Illinois
Peoria metropolitan area, Illinois